Gabriel Voisin (5 February 1880 – 25 December 1973) was a French aviation pioneer and the creator of Europe's first manned, engine-powered, heavier-than-air aircraft capable of a sustained (1 km), circular, controlled flight, which was made by Henry Farman on 13 January 1908 near Paris, France. During World War I the company founded by Voisin  became a major producer of military aircraft, notably the Voisin III. Subsequently, he switched to the design and production of luxury automobiles under the name Avions Voisin.

Early life
Gabriel Voisin was born on 5 February 1880 in Belleville-sur-Saône, France, and his brother Charles Voisin, two years younger than him, was his main childhood companion. When his father abandoned the family his mother, Amélie, took her sons  to Neuville-sur-Saône, where they settled near her father's factory.

Their grandfather, Charles Forestier, took charge of the boys' education with military rigor. The boys also went for expeditions along the river, went fishing, and built numerous contraptions. When his grandfather died, Gabriel was sent to school in Lyon and Paris where he learned industrial design, a field in which Voisin claims to have been exceptionally gifted. He often returned home, and by the end of the century the brothers had built, among other things, a rifle, a steam boat and an automobile.

Early flying experiments
After completing his studies at the Ecole des Beaux Arts de Lyon in 1899, he joined an architectural firm in Paris. While in Paris he saw the Clément Ader Avion III, which was displayed at the Paris International Exposition of 1900. This awakened an interest in the problems of powered flight. After nine months of military service, in February 1904, he attended a lecture given by Captain Ferdinand Ferber, one of the leading figures in French aviation circles at the time. After the lecture Voisin approached Ferber and was given an introduction to Ernest Archdeacon, the leading  promoter and financial supporter of early French aviation, and Archdeacon hired him to test fly the Wright-type glider that he had had built. Archdeacon then commissioned Voisin to build another glider of similar design, but differing in having a fixed horizontal stabiliser behind the wings, in addition to its front-mounted elevator. This was tested at Issy-les-Moulineaux on 26 March 1905 by towing it into the air using Archdeacon's automobile. It was not rebuilt.

Voisin then designed and built a glider equipped with floats for Archdeacon. This aircraft marks the first use of Hargrave cells, used both for the empennage and the wings. While working on this aircraft Voisin had been approached by Louis Blériot, who asked him to build him a similar machine, later known as the Bleriot II. This differed principally in having a smaller span lower wing, resulting in the outer 'side-curtains' between upper and lower wings being angled outwards. After this first flight Bleriot suggested to Voisin that they form a partnership to build aircraft, and so Voisin ended his association with Archdeacon's syndicate. Voisin attempted flights in both aircraft on 18 July 1905. Although the weather was unsuitable, with a strong crosswind, Voisin decided to attempt to fly the aircraft since it was difficult to obtain the necessary permission to use the river. He made a short flight in his own glider and then attempted a flight in Bleriot's. This took off quickly, but Voisin could not control it and it crashed into the river. Voisin was trapped inside and was lucky to escape drowning. Louis Bleriot's cine footage of this experiment survives in the Smithsonian's National Air and Space Museum.

The next aircraft built by Voisin for Bleriot during 1906, the Bleriot III, was a tandem biplane powered by an Antoinette engine driving two tractor propellers with the wings formed into a closed ellipse as seen from the front: according to Voisin's account, Bleriot had originally wanted the lifting surfaces to be circular in front elevation, having experimented with models of this form, and the adoption of their eventual form was the result of a compromise between the two men. This aircraft was unsuccessful, as was its subsequent modification (the Blériot IV) in which the forward wing was replaced by a conventional biplane arrangement and a second engine added. Experiments were made first with floats and then with a wheeled undercarriage, and the aircraft was wrecked in a taxiing accident at Bagatelle on the morning of 12 November 1906. Later that day, also at Bagatelle, Alberto Santos-Dumont succeeded in flying his 14-bis canard biplane for a distance of over 100 metres. After the failure of this machine Voisin and Blériot dissolved their partnership, and Voisin set up a company with his brother Charles Voisin to design and manufacture aircraft.

Commercial airplane production: Voisin Frères

Appareils d'Aviation Les Frères Voisin was the world's first commercial airplane factory.  At this time aspiring European aviators were in fierce competition to be the first to achieve powered heavier-than-air flights. Until Wilbur Wright's demonstrations at Le Mans (France) in August 1908 many people did not believe the claims of the Wright brothers to have achieved sustained flights: for instance, that the Wrights' Flyer III had flown 24 miles (38.9 km) in 39 minutes 23 seconds on 5 October 1905.

Santos-Dumont's flights in the 14-bis, in November 1906, were Europe's first officially observed and verified heavier-than-air powered flights. Despite its fame, all that the 14-bis could achieve was a short flight on a straight line. It had no potential beyond that and it was quickly abandoned.

Two almost identical pusher biplane machines, with Antoinette engines, were built by the Voisin brothers for two early aviation pioneers: the first for Leon Delagrange in March 1907, and the second for his friend and rival Henry Farman in October 1907. The second one became known as the Voisin-Farman I, and was flown by Farman to win Archdeacon's Grand Prix d'Aviation for making the first one-kilometre closed-circuit flight on 13 January 1908. Both Farman and Delagrange won great fame with these aircraft, competing with each other for aviation records. The Voisins' machines became widely known as Europe's first successful aircraft.

In 1909, Voisin was made a Chevalier of the French Legion of Honor, and along with Blériot was awarded the Prix Osiris,  awarded by the Institut de France. In the same year Voisin married Adrienne-Lola Bernet; they had one daughter, Janine.

Later Farman modified and improved the Voisin pusher biplane considerably. He eventually ended his cooperation with the Voisin brothers, following a disagreement, and started manufacturing his own designs which became very successful. The Voisin brothers continued the expansion of their factory resulting for example in the Canard Voisin of 1911.

After the death of Charles Voisin: Aéroplanes G. Voisin

Voisin was greatly affected by the death of his brother Charles in 1912 in an automobile accident near Belleville-sur-Saône, but he continued the expansion of the Boulogne-Billancourt factory, under the changed name Société Anonyme des Aéroplanes G. Voisin.

After 1912, the factory shifted its manufacturing and sales towards supplying the French military. When World War I broke out in 1914, Voisin immediately volunteered for service with French air corps. The Voisin III, a two-seater pusher biplane with a 120 hp Salmson radial engine, was extensively used for bombing and observation missions during World War I. It had a light steel frame and thus could be stationed outdoors. The Voisin III was built in large numbers (about 1,000) between 1914 and 1916 and sold not only to the French air services but also to other allies, including Russia. The Type VIII (about 1,100 built) and Type X (about 900 built) were delivered in 1917 and 1918. Those last to appear Voisin military aircraft were almost identical in appearance to the Voisin III, although they were heavier and featured twice as powerful Peugeot and Renault engines. They also had a longer range and carried almost twice the bomb load of their predecessor. A complete and original Voisin Type VIII bomber aircraft is preserved in excellent condition at the Smithsonian's National Air and Space Museum in Washington,D.C. It is the oldest preserved bomber aircraft in the world.

Switch to car production: Avions Voisin
Voisin abandoned aviation, citing the trauma of the military use of his more advanced airplanes (the Voisin III) during the war in addition to the then embryonic demand for civilian aircraft. From then until 1958, he concentrated his efforts on making automobiles under the brand of Avions Voisin. His early cars were some of the finest luxury vehicles in the world, with unique technical details. Many of them won in competition. However, the luxury car market shrank in the 1930s because of depressed economic conditions followed in June 1940 by the invasion of France by Nazi Germany forcing him to close down his factory.  "In 1939, a certain Hitler unleashed the regrettable chain of events that French people are all too familiar with." - Gabriel Voisin.  After 1945, he turned his attention to designing a minimalist car for the masses, the Biscooter, thousands of which were produced under licence in Spain during the 1950s as the Biscúter. Today, his pre-war luxury automobiles have become highly prized by collectors, both in Europe and in the USA.

In the 1920s, the company also proposed a 'Motor-Fly' which was a bicycle with a small auxiliary 2-stroke engine added to the back wheel, and also produced pre-fabricated houses that could be built in 3 days ('votre maison en trois jours - your house in 3 days'). These were available with a floor area of 35, 75 or 105 square meters, and were constructed around a metal framework. Some of these houses still exist, but none in their original condition. The houses carry the logo 'Avion Voisin Issy', just like the other products from the factory.

Death
In 1960 he retired to his country house, "La Cadolle", at Le Villars near Tournus on the banks of the Saône river, where he wrote his memoirs. A few years later, in 1965, he was made a Commander of the Legion d'Honneur. He died on Christmas Day, 25 December 1973, in Ozenay, Saône-et-Loire at the age of 93. He was buried at Le Villars.

See also
Léon Lemartin – engineer on the Seine glider and the Gnome Omega rotary engine.

Further reading
 Courtault, Pascal Automobiles Voisin,1919–1950.London: White Mouse Editions, 1991  ( in English )
 Cahisa, Raymond  L'Aviation d'Ader et des temps heroique. Paris: Editions Albin Michel,1950.
 Elliott, B.A. Bleriot, Herald of An Age. Stroud: Tempus, 2000. 
 Gibbs-Smith, C.H. The Rebirth of European Aviation. London, HMSO. 1974. 
 Opdycke, Leonard e. French Aeroplanes Before the Great War Atglen, PA: Schiffer, 1999. 
 Voisin, Gabriel,1960,"Mes 10.000 Cerfs-Volants". Voisin's first volume of personal memoirs. Editor:"Editions de la Table Ronde", Paris . Also published in English under the title : Men, Women and 10,000 kites by Putnam,London, 1963.
Voisin Gabriel, 1962, "Mes milles et une Voitures" ( My 1001 automobiles ). Voisin's second volume of personal memoirs. Editor: "Editions de la Table Ronde", Paris.
 Voisin, Gabriel, 1966, "Henry Farman (1874–1960)",  :" Revue Aeronautique Trimestrielle des Vieilles Tiges " No7, January 1966. pp 8–16.
 Tatin,V., 1910, " Theorie et Pratique de l'Aviation ", H.Dunod et E.Pinat Editeurs, Paris.

References

1880 births
1973 deaths
Aviation pioneers
People from Rhône (department)
Aviators from Lyon
French automobile designers
French founders of automobile manufacturers
Commandeurs of the Légion d'honneur